Gerolamo Quaglia (8 February 1902 – 11 November 1985) was a featherweight Greco-Roman wrestler. Born in Brazil he competed for Italy in the 1924 and 1928 Olympics and won a bronze medal in 1928.

References

External links
 

1902 births
1985 deaths
Olympic wrestlers of Italy
Wrestlers at the 1924 Summer Olympics
Wrestlers at the 1928 Summer Olympics
Italian male sport wrestlers
Olympic bronze medalists for Italy
Olympic medalists in wrestling
Medalists at the 1928 Summer Olympics
20th-century Italian people